U-boat (German: U-Boot) is a German military submarine of World War I and II.

U-boat or U-Boot may also refer to:

Software 
Das U-Boot, computer software, a GNU GPL boot loader
U-boat (video game), a 1994 video game
Uboat (video game), an upcoming submarine simulation video game

Transport 
U-boat, a nickname for the GE Universal Series of diesel locomotives built by General Electric 
Southern Railway's U and U1 class locomotives, nicknamed "U-boats"
U-boat, an Australian class of interurban railcars, otherwise known as U sets
U-boat, a nickname for the WAGR U Class steam locomotives built by the North British Locomotive Company in 1942

Other 
U-Boot (beer cocktail), a cocktail made with vodka and beer
"U Boat", a song on the album Kasabian  by the band of the same name 

it:U-boat